

This is a list of the National Register of Historic Places listings in Perry County, Indiana.

This is intended to be a complete list of the properties and districts on the National Register of Historic Places in Perry County, Indiana, United States. Latitude and longitude coordinates are provided for many National Register properties and districts; these locations may be seen together in a map.

There are 9 properties and districts listed on the National Register in the county, including 1 National Historic Landmark.  Another property was once listed on the National Register but has been removed.

Properties and districts located in incorporated areas display the name of the municipality, while properties and districts in unincorporated areas display the name of their civil township.  Properties and districts split between multiple jurisdictions display the names of all jurisdictions.

Current listings

|}

Former listing

|}

See also

 List of National Historic Landmarks in Indiana
 National Register of Historic Places listings in Indiana
 Listings in neighboring counties: Breckinridge (KY), Crawford, Dubois, Hancock (KY), Meade (KY), Spencer
 List of Indiana state historical markers in Perry County

References

 
Perry County